Samuel Colchin (fl. 1747 – 1779) was an English cricketer who played in the 1770s.

A nephew of Robert Colchin, a noted single wicket cricketer of the first half of the 18th century, he played in a total of 10 first-class matches, four of which were for Kent sides, all as a given man against Hampshire sides. He played five matches for England sides and made one top-level appearance for a Hampshire XI.

Colchin was christened at Bromley in Kent in June 1747. He is last mentioned in June 1779 playing in a five-a-side single wicket match at the Artillery Ground for John Sackville, 3rd Duke of Dorset's team against Sir Horatio Mann's team.

Notes

References

Year of birth unknown
Year of death unknown
English cricketers
English cricketers of 1701 to 1786
Kent cricketers
Hampshire cricketers